The "No fem el CIM" (NFC) movement was founded in 2003 in the Penedès region of Catalonia. It was then that locals learned that the Catalan government wanted to construct a dry port between the towns of Banyeres del Penedès, l'Arboç i Sant Jaume dels Domenys. However, it was not until August 2005 that the movement began to take-off, gaining national recognition, spurred by the release of the government's 544 acre (220 hectare) plan for the inland port. Since then, members of the movement have held numerous protests as well as meetings with local and national government entities in an attempt to prevent dry port construction.

Support 
At the end of 2008, the groups that had come out in support of the NFC movement included:
1 Mayor Board of Baix Penedès
2 County Boards and Commissions: Baix Penedès, Alt Penedès
14 City Councils: l'Arboç, Banyeres del Penedès, Bellvei, la Bisbal del Penedès, la Granada, Llorenç del Penedès, Sant Jaume dels Domenys, Torrelavit, Olesa de Bonesvalls, Sant Pere de Riudebitlles, Cunit, El Vendrell, Vilafranca del Penedès i Vilanova i la Geltrú.
5 Business Associations
5 Labor Unions
7 Environmental Groups
9 Foundations and Associations
54 Cultural Groups
various national and local political groups
5.385 Catalan residents
1.120 allegation to the PTPCT (planification of Tarragona Area)

Structure 
The "No fem el CIM"  movement is a grassroots movement that operates by means of five autonomous committees:
 The NFC Communication Committee
 The NFC Publicity Committee
 The NFC Fundraising Committee
 The NFC Political Action Committee
 The NFC Legal Action Committee

External links 
NoFemelCIM Web
NoFemelCIM Blog
NoFemelCIM Youtube
NoFemelCIM Facebook
NoFemelCIM Twitter
NoFemelCIM Wikipedia
 NoFemelCIM Flickr
NoFemelCIM Vimeo
NoFemelCIM Rss

Organisations based in Catalonia
Baix Penedès
Alt Penedès
Ecology organizations